Felix Vanderstraeten (18 July 1823 – 29 June 1884) was a Belgian liberal politician and burgomaster of Brussels.

Felix Vanderstraeten was a brewer, and became alderman and burgomaster of Brussels (1879–1881).

See also
 List of mayors of the City of Brussels

Sources
 Cooremans, Lucien, Félix Vanderstraeten proposa déjà, en 1880, de faire participer les communes de l'agglomération aux charges financières de la capitale, in : De 1830 à 1958. Douze bourgmestres libéraux ont fait de Bruxelles une des plus prestigieuses capitales, s.l., s.n., s.d., s.p.

1791 births
1868 deaths
Mayors of the City of Brussels